The PowerBook Duo 230 is a subnotebook personal computer introduced on October 19, 1992 by Apple Computer, Inc. Priced at US $2,610, the PowerBook Duo 230 was the high end model of the two simultaneously released PowerBook Duos, the lower end being the US $2,250 PowerBook Duo 210. With a 33 MHz Motorola 68030 microprocessor, 4 MB of RAM and an 80 or 120 MB SCSI hard disk drive, the PowerBook Duo 230 was nearly identical to the simultaneously released PowerBook 180 except for the smaller 9.1 inch greyscale "supertwist" passive-matrix LCD and the lack of a  68882 floating-point unit.

With the October 1993 introduction of the PowerBook Duo 250 and 270c, the 230 replaced the 210 in the entry level, eventually being discontinued entirely on July 27, 1994 shortly after the introduction of the 68040-based PowerBook Duo 280 and 280c.

Specifications 
Processor: Motorola 68030 CPU running at 33 MHz
Floating Point Unit: None
RAM: 4 MB, expandable to 28 MB via a DRAM card
Hard disk: 80 or 120 MB
Floppy disk: None
Systems Supported: 7.1-7.6.1
ADB: No
Serial: 1 Mini-DIN-8 (includes LocalTalk)
Modem: optional
Expansion: external 152 pin Processor Direct Slot, used for a docking station
Screen: 9.1" 4-bit grayscale passive matrix LCD, 640×400 resolution

Timeline

References

Duo 230
Computer-related introductions in 1992